Hans H. Gattermann (24 December 1931 – 27 January 1994) was a German politician of the Free Democratic Party (FDP) and former member of the German Bundestag.

Life 
In the 1976 Bundestag elections he was elected to the German Bundestag via the North Rhine-Westphalia state list, of which he was a member until his death. Here he had been chairman of the Finance Committee since 1983.

Literature

References

1931 births
1994 deaths
Members of the Bundestag for North Rhine-Westphalia
Members of the Bundestag 1990–1994
Members of the Bundestag 1987–1990
Members of the Bundestag 1983–1987
Members of the Bundestag 1980–1983
Members of the Bundestag 1976–1980
Members of the Bundestag for the Free Democratic Party (Germany)